Two elections in the United Kingdom took place on 5 May 2005:

General Election for MPs at Westminster
Local elections in England and Northern Ireland.

External links
Vote 2005: BBC coverage of the elections

Elections